Brechin High School is a non-denominational secondary school in Brechin, Angus, Scotland

Admissions
It has approximately 660 students, and real listically 4 staff.  The school has a relationship with the town's cathedral stretching back to the early 15th century, with the formation of the choir school.

Feeder primary schools include two in Brechin: Andover and Maisondieu and four rural schools: Edzell, Lethnot, Stracathro, and Tarfside.

Historically, school pupils were split into four houses: Dalhousie, Maisondieu, Kinnaird and Trinity (named after local country estates) with siblings always being placed in the same house but this system was recently changed and pupils are now split between houses Dun, Farnell and Menmuir (named after local villages).

The school is in the north-west of Brechin, near the A90 bypass, and next to a disused railway line.

Alumni

 Dame Anne Begg MP, Labour Member of Parliament from 1997 to 2015 for Aberdeen South.
 William Eddie, cricketer and Provost for the City and Royal Burgh of Brechin
 John Gillies LLD FRS FRSE FSA, Historiographer Royal, 1793–1836.
 Thomas Guthrie DD, founder of the Ragged Schools of Scotland and Moderator of the Free Church of Scotland, 1862.
 William Guthrie, eighteenth-century historian and geographer.
 Kirstene Hair, Conservative Member of Parliament from 2017 to 2019 for Angus.
 Joseph Fairweather Lamb FRSE, Chandos Professor of Physiology at the University of St Andrews.
 David Low, Bishop of Ross and Argyll, 1819-1838 and Bishop of Moray, 1838–1850.
 Alexander Ferrier Mitchell DD LLD, Professor of Ecclesiastical History at the University of St Andrews and Moderator of the Church of Scotland.
 David Myles, Conservative Member of Parliament from 1979 to 1983 for Banffshire.
 Robin Orr CBE, composer, professor of music and founder chairman of Scottish Opera.
 Sir Robert Watson-Watt KCB FRS FRAeS, inventor of radar.
 David Will CBE, Vice-President from 1990 to 2007 of FIFA.
 Stuart Wilson, cricketer

References

External links
 Brechin High School - official website
 Brechin High's on Scottish Schools Online

Secondary schools in Angus, Scotland
1429 establishments in Scotland
Educational institutions established in the 15th century